The 1927 Auburn Tigers football team represented Auburn University in the 1927 college football season. The Tigers' were led by head coach Dave Morey in his second season for the first three games and then by Boozer Pitts to finish the season with a record of zero wins, seven losses and two ties (0–7–2 overall, 0–6–1 in the SoCon). The loss to Stetson was the first on Auburn's campus since 1908.

Schedule

Source: 1927 Auburn football schedule

References

Auburn
Auburn Tigers football seasons
College football winless seasons
Auburn Tigers football